Dominic Serres  (1722–1793), also known as Dominic Serres the Elder, was a French-born painter strongly associated with the English school of painting, and with paintings with a naval or marine theme. Such were his connections with the English art world, that he became one of the founding members of the Royal Academy in 1768, and was later briefly (from 1792 until his death) its librarian.

Life and works
Born in Auch, Gascony, he was initially expected to train as a priest but instead travelled to Spain and became a ship's captain, sailing to Cuba. He was taken prisoner by the British navy towards the end of the 1740s and eventually settled in London in about 1758, where it is believed he trained as a painter in Northamptonshire and later in London under Charles Brooking. If Serres did not settle in London until 1758, however, he could not have studied for long under Charles Brooking, since Brooking was buried on 25 March 1759.

Reflecting his early career, many of his paintings have naval themes. Working for a publisher documenting the events in the Seven Years' War (1756–1763), he painted a series of depictions including the capture of Havana in 1762. He also painted events in the American Revolutionary War, such as the disastrous Penobscot Expedition launched by the Americans in 1779. In 1780, he was appointed Marine Painter to King George III.

Serres died in 1793, and was buried at St. Marylebone Old Church. His eldest son John Thomas Serres (1759–1825) also became a prolific marine artist.

Gallery

References

Further reading
Russett, Alan. Dominic Serres 1719 - 1793: War Artist to the Navy (Antiques Collectors Club, 2001).

External links

 
Dominic Serres online (ArtCyclopedia)
Dominic Serres (Biography and works at the Royal Academy of Arts, London).
Serres biography and works (National Maritime Museum, London)
Serres ancestry ("rootsweb")
An English man-o'war shortening sail entering Portsmouth harbour (painting - exhibited in 1778)

1722 births
1793 deaths
18th-century French painters
French male painters
French marine artists
Royal Academicians
18th-century French male artists